Karim Malpica Torres (born August 24, 1978 in Mexico City) is a Puerto Rican professional basketball player. He is a 6'2" Guard who currently plays for Jefes de Fuerza Lagunera in the Liga Nacional de Baloncesto Profesional in Mexico.  He is also a member of the Mexico national basketball team.

Career
Malpica has played professionally in Puerto Rico and Mexico.  On July 23, 2009, Malpica signed with traditional Mexican League powerhouse Soles de Mexicali.

Malpica is a member of the Mexico national basketball team.  He competed for the team at the 2006 and 2008 Centrobasket tournaments.  He made his debut at the FIBA Americas Tournament for the team in 2009.

References

External links
 RealGM profile

1978 births
Living people
Basketball players from Mexico City
Guards (basketball)
Jefes de Fuerza Lagunera players
Leones de Ponce basketball players
Mexican men's basketball players
Ostioneros de Guaymas (basketball) players
Panteras de Aguascalientes players
Soles de Mexicali players